Andhra Pradesh Eastern Power Distribution Company Limited or APEPDCL is the Electricity Distribution company owned by the Government of Andhra Pradesh for the Eleven Districts of Andhra Pradesh.

History

The Eastern Power Distribution Company of Andhra Pradesh Ltd (APEPDCL) was incorporated under the Companies Act, 1956 as a Public Limited Company on 31 March, 2000 with headquarters at Visakhapatnam.

APEPDCL Network

APEPDCL encompasses an area of Eleven districts viz., Srikakulam, Alluri Sitharama Raju, Vizianagaram, Parvathipuram Manyam,  Visakhapatnam, Anakapalli, Kakinada,  East Godavari, Konaseema, Eluru and West Godavari.

See also
Andhra Pradesh Southern Power Distribution Company Limited
Andhra Pradesh Power Generation Corporation
Transmission Corporation of Andhra Pradesh

References

Electric power distribution network operators in India
Energy in Andhra Pradesh
State agencies of Andhra Pradesh
State electricity agencies of India
Energy companies established in 2000
Indian companies established in 2000
2000 establishments in Andhra Pradesh